is a 2013 Japanese film directed by Yūichi Onuma.

Cast
Aoi Morikawa as Manami 
Mugi Kadowaki as Chiyuki 
Maaya Kondō 
Aoi Yoshikura 
Ayuri Konno
Tsukina Takai

References

External links

Films directed by Yūichi Onuma
2013 films
2010s Japanese films